Pieter Braun (born 21 January 1993 in Terheijden) is a Dutch athlete competing in the combined events. He won the gold medal at the 2015 European U23 Championships.  He also competed in the decathlon in the 2016 Summer Olympics.

Competition record

Personal bests
Outdoor
100 metres – 10.90 (+0.5 m/s) (Götzis 2017)
400 metres – 48.02 (Tallinn 2015)
1500 metres – 4:24.29 (Götzis 2018)
110 metres hurdles – 14.13 (+0.7 m/s) (Tallinn 2015)
High jump – 2.04 (Beijing 2015)
Pole vault – 5.05 (Amsterdam 2016)
Long jump – 7.71 (+0.5 m/s) (Götzis 2017)
Shot put – 15.28 (Götzis 2018)
Discus throw – 47.33 (Vught 2018)
Javelin throw – 64.19 (Götzis 2019)
Decathlon – 8.342 (Götzis 2019)

Indoor
60 metres – 7.21 (Dortmund 2016)
1000 metres – 2:40.19 (Sheffield 2014)
60 metres hurdles – 8.08 (Apeldoorn 2016)
High jump – 2.02 (Apeldoorn 2014)
Pole vault – 5.04 (Apeldoorn 2016)
Long jump – 7.47 (Apeldoorn 2018)
Shot put – 14.44 (Apeldoorn 2017)
Heptathlon – 5837 (Apeldoorn 2015)

References

1993 births
Living people
Dutch decathletes
People from Drimmelen
World Athletics Championships athletes for the Netherlands
Athletes (track and field) at the 2016 Summer Olympics
Olympic athletes of the Netherlands
Sportspeople from North Brabant
21st-century Dutch people